Paananen is a Finnish surname. Notable people with the surname include:

Adiel Paananen (1897–1968), Finnish cross-country skier
Aleksi Paananen (born 1993), Finnish footballer
Ilmo Paananen (1927–2014), Finnish civil servant and politician

Finnish-language surnames